John Fogarty (1848–1904) was an Australian politician. From 1893 to 1904, he was a Member of the Queensland Legislative Assembly for the Electoral district of Drayton and Toowoomba. He was also the mayor of Toowoomba.

Fogarty died in office and is buried in Drayton and Toowoomba Cemetery.

References

1848 births
1904 deaths
Members of the Queensland Legislative Assembly
Mayors of Toowoomba
Australian Labor Party members of the Parliament of Queensland
19th-century Australian politicians